Blepephaeus irregularis is a species of beetle in the family Cerambycidae. It was described by Heller in 1915. It is known from the Philippines. It contains the varietas Blepephaeus irregularis var. alboreductus.

References

Blepephaeus
Beetles described in 1915